Cattivik is an Italian humoristic comic book character created by Bonvi (Franco Bonvicini).

The character first appeared in 1965. He later appeared in the magazine Tiramolla on 19 July 1970. Later, the development of the character was given to one of his assistants, Silver (creator of Lupo Alberto, another successful comic strip in Italy), because Bonvi was too busy with his other works (among them, the famous Sturmtruppen). The character is a more or less declared parody of another successful series in Italy, Diabolik, created by the Giussani Sisters. The character quickly became popular in Italy, his anti-heroic nature is overblown to grotesque proportions (he is a burglar and general criminal, lives in sewers, takes showers with toxic waste and hates everything "good natured") and politically incorrect humour (fart and burp jokes, italian politicians caricatures and social commentary).

The two main characteristics of Cattivik are the pear-shaped form (which is an evolution of the original form designed by Bonvi, which was shaped more like a giant pepperoni) and an accent (he omits the final vowels of most words) that could be both Northern-Italian or Apulian.

A magazine called Cattivik was published in Italy from 1989. It ceased to be published in December 2005.

In other media 
 Cattivik a video game based on the character was released by Idea Software in 1992.
 The character has also been adapted in a CGI animated TV series in 2008.
 The character has also a collectible figure.
 "Cattivik" is also a video game for the ZX Spectrum By Gabriele Amore and Alessandro Grussu.

References

External links 

 Cattivik at ComicVine.com

Italian comic strips
Italian comics titles
1965 comics debuts
Comics characters introduced in 1965
2005 comics endings
Italian comics characters
Parody comics
Satirical comics
Fictional criminals
Fictional Italian people